Wilma Cozart Fine (March 29, 1927, Aberdeen, Mississippi – September 21, 2009, Harrison, New York) was an American record producer who, with her husband, C. Robert Fine (1922–1982), ran the classical division of Mercury Records in the 1950s and early 1960s. She produced hundreds of recordings, particularly the Mercury Living Presence series. According to her 2009 obituary in The New York Times, the recordings remain "prized by collectors for the depth and realism of their sound."

A native of Fort Worth, Texas, she attended the University of North Texas studying music education at the UNT College of Music and business.

In 2011, Cozart Fine was awarded a posthumous Grammy Trustees Award for her significant contributions to the recording industry.

References

External links
Interview with Wilma Cozart Fine, November 20, 1995
Wilma Cozart Fine: The Muse of Mercury 2010 article

1927 births
2009 deaths
Record producers from Mississippi
Record producers from Texas
University of North Texas College of Music alumni
Women audio engineers
American women record producers
Early Recording Engineers (1930-1959)